The Lee Richardson Zoo is an AZA accredited zoo in Garden City, Kansas.  The zoo has more than 100 species of animals located on  inside Finnup Park and includes many animals that are non-native to southwest Kansas.  Admission is free for pedestrians or $10 per car.

History

The zoo was started in 1927 by the city and the local chapter of the Izaak Walton League, with two skunks brought in by  Lee Richardson, who was Chief of Police and Park and founder and Zoo Superintendent at the time. The zoo was formally named for Lee Richardson in 1950, just a year before he died.

The Lee Richardson Zoo is a department of the City of Garden City.

Exhibits

North American Plains
This section of the zoo includes "Kansas Waters" with its river otters and the "Swift Fox" exhibit, which both opened in 2005, as well as pronghorn, elk, and bison.

South American Pampas
The South American Pampas exhibit includes maned wolf, anteater, alpaca, and rhea. Flamingos are housed next to this exhibit.

Aviary
The "Marie Osterbuhr Aviary" was opened in 1985. It includes a large open air flight cage that is home to the kookaburras, Mandarin ducks, doves, as well as four indoor displays that are home to species including Bearded barbets.

Cat Canyon
Cat Canyon opened in 2012 and houses the zoo's cougars, jaguars, and bobcats.

Pachyderms
The Pachyderm exhibit housed African bush elephants. The two elephants currently at the zoo arrived in 2006. The elephants were moved to the Cheyenne Mountain Zoo in Colorado Springs in 2015.

Down Under
Down Under is home to the zoos Australian animals, including emus and a breeding herd of red kangaroo.

African Plains

The African Plains area consists of two large open yards designed to look like the African Savannah, and includes addax, and East African crowned cranes. This section also includes giraffes, an eastern black rhinoceros crash, and lions.

Wild Asia
The Wild Asia exhibit opened in 1998, and includes siamangs, red pandas, Bactrian camels, snow leopards, Amur leopards, goral, takin, a pair of sloth bears, along with an Asian farm that includes sheep, and chickens.

Gallery

Notes

External links

Zoos in Kansas
Buildings and structures in Finney County, Kansas
Tourist attractions in Finney County, Kansas
Zoos established in 1927
1927 establishments in Kansas